Rockingham Castle is a former royal castle and hunting lodge in Rockingham Forest approximately two miles north from the town centre of Corby, Northamptonshire.

History

11th – 14th centuries
The site on which the castle stands was used in the Iron Age, in the Roman period, by the Saxons, Normans, Tudors and also in the medieval 
period. This is because its position on elevated ground provides clear views of the Welland Valley from a strong defensible location.

William the Conqueror ordered the construction of a wooden Motte and Bailey at Rockingham in the 11th century shortly after the Norman conquest of England. Within three decades, William II replaced it with a stone castle. A stone keep was added to the large motte and the outer bailey was enclosed by a curtain wall. The castle was then used as a royal retreat throughout the Norman and Plantagenet periods. Nearby Rockingham Forest was especially good for hunting wild boar and deer.

In 1270 Henry III strengthened the castle with the addition of a twin D-tower gatehouse. But less than a century later Edward III became the last monarch to visit the castle while it was possessed by the Crown.

15th – 21st centuries

By the late 15th century Rockingham Castle had fallen into disrepair. Sir Edward Watson (founder of the Watson dynasty) acquired the lease of the castle from Henry VIII. Parts of the castle were later replaced with a Tudor house with gardens. The former royal castle became a hunting lodge for the nobility. Watson's grandson Lewis Watson acquired the freehold of the castle and lands from the Crown. Watson was successively a knight, baronet and baron.

In the 1640s, during the English Civil War, Rockingham was garrisoned by royalist troops. They fought several small skirmishes with Parliamentary forces. In 1643 Rockingham was captured by Parliamentarian general Henry Grey, 1st Earl of Stamford and Lewis Watson was temporarily forced to leave. Its remaining walls were slighted in 1646. In the latter 17th and 18th centuries, Rockingham returned to being a civil residence.

Lewis' grandson, also Lewis, already Baron Rockingham, was created Earl of Rockingham in 1714. The earldom was extinguished with the death of the 5th baron (3rd earl) in 1746. The estate then passed to his cousin Thomas Watson-Wentworth, who was created Marquess of Rockingham later that year. When Charles Watson-Wentworth, 2nd Marquess of Rockingham died in 1782, the estate (among others) passed to the son of his sister, William Fitzwilliam, 4th Earl Fitzwilliam. The castle underwent further restoration in the late 19th century.

The house later passed from the Watsons, through the maternal line, to Sir Michael Culme-Seymour, 5th Baronet in 1925. He lived here with his wife, Lady Mary Faith Montagu, a daughter of the 9th Earl of Sandwich, until 1967, when he transferred it to his nephew, Commander Michael Saunders.

Today the mainstay of the castle is the home of the Saunders-Watson family led by James Saunders Watson, the son of Michael Saunders, who achieved £4,000,000 in revenue from its events and rentals in 2017. He served as High Sheriff of Northamptonshire for 2018/19.

Location

The parish borders directly onto the town of Corby. Rockingham (and Corby) are part of North Northamptonshire, part of the ceremonial county of Northamptonshire.

The castle overlooks the villages of Rockingham and Caldecott, and has views over the Welland Valley. Privately owned, it is open to the public for events and on certain days.

The place was visited by writer Charles Dickens, who was a friend of Richard and Lavinia Watson, ancestors of the current family. The castle is arguably the inspiration for Chesney Wold in Dickens' novel Bleak House, published in 1853.

The castle takes its name from the manor of Rockingham, which was the only manor of the parish which in turn had markedly few churchlands, especially as is common after the dissolution of the monasteries. Rockingham Forest was, largely outside of the parish, named after the place during the time of William the Conqueror because of the castle's importance as a royal retreat.

A cricket pitch lies within the grounds and is home to Old Eastonians Cricket Club.

Filming
Rockingham Castle was used as a principal setting for the BBC English Civil War period drama By the Sword Divided. In the TV series, "Arnescote Castle" was the home of the Royalist Lacey family. The castle also featured in the film Top Secret!, which starred Val Kilmer.

See also
Castles in Great Britain and Ireland
List of castles in England

References

Further reading

External links

Official website
Photos of Rockingham Castle and surrounding area on geograph

Castles in Northamptonshire
Country houses in Northamptonshire
Historic house museums in Northamptonshire
Gardens in Northamptonshire
Grade I listed buildings in Northamptonshire